Jimmie Giles, Jr. (born November 8, 1954) is an American former professional football player who was a tight end in the National Football League (NFL). He played college football at Alcorn State University and was selected by the Houston Oilers in the third round of the 1977 NFL Draft.  The ,   Giles played in 13 NFL seasons from 1977 to 1989.  A four-time Pro Bowl selection, Giles's career flourished as a member of the Tampa Bay Buccaneers during the early and mid-1980s, despite being used mainly as a blocker during several seasons in which he fell into disfavor with the coaching staff. Giles' benching coincided with a training-camp holdout, the first in Buccaneers history by a player under contract, and the difficult Doug Williams negotiations that resulted in his departure for the USFL. Giles' four touchdowns against the Miami Dolphins on October 20, 1985, tied Earl Campbell's record for the most touchdowns by a Dolphins opponent, and is still (as of 2017) the Buccaneers' single-game record; despite this, the Dolphins would win 41-38. Dolphins coach Don Shula said of the performance, "I can't remember any tight end dominating us that way". Buccaneer teammate Gerald Carter said that Giles could have been "one of the best all-time tight ends, if they'd used him more". In 1988 with the Philadelphia Eagles, he caught a touchdown on one of the most memorable plays in Monday Night Football. Quarterback Randall Cunningham escaped a tackle from Giants linebacker Carl Banks and threw a touchdown to Giles.

On July 13, 2011, the Buccaneers officially announced that Jimmie Giles would be inducted into the team's Ring of Honor on December 4, 2011, when the Buccaneers hosted the Carolina Panthers.

References

1954 births
Living people
American football tight ends
Alcorn State Braves football players
Houston Oilers players
Tampa Bay Buccaneers players
Detroit Lions players
Philadelphia Eagles players
National Conference Pro Bowl players
Sportspeople from Greenville, Mississippi
African-American players of American football
Players of American football from Mississippi
Bellingham Dodgers players
Alcorn State Braves baseball players
21st-century African-American people
20th-century African-American sportspeople